Anarcho-capitalism (or, colloquially, ancap) is an anti-statist, libertarian, and anti-political philosophy and economic theory that seeks to abolish centralized states in favor of stateless societies with systems of private property enforced by private agencies, the non-aggression principle, free markets and the right-libertarian interpretation of self-ownership, which extends the concept to include control of private property as part of the self. In the absence of statute, anarcho-capitalists hold that society tends to contractually self-regulate and civilize through participation in the free market, which they describe as a voluntary society involving the voluntary exchange of services and goods. In a theoretical anarcho-capitalist society, the system of private property would still exist and be enforced by private defense agencies and/or insurance companies selected by customers, which would operate competitively in a market and fulfill the roles of courts and the police.

According to its proponents, various historical theorists have espoused philosophies similar to anarcho-capitalism, but the first person to use the term anarcho-capitalism was Murray Rothbard, in the 1940s. Rothbard, a leading figure in the 20th-century American libertarian movement, synthesized elements from the Austrian School, classical liberalism and 19th-century American individualist anarchists and mutualists Lysander Spooner and Benjamin Tucker while rejecting the labor theory of value. Rothbard's anarcho-capitalist society would operate under a mutually agreed-upon "legal code which would be generally accepted, and which the courts would pledge themselves to follow". This legal code would recognize contracts between individuals, private property, self-ownership and tort law in keeping with the non-aggression principle. Rothbard views the power of the state as unjustified, arguing that it restricts individual rights and prosperity, and creates social and economic problems.

Anarcho-capitalists and right-libertarians cite several historical precedents of what they believe to be examples of quasi-anarcho-capitalism, including the Republic of Cospaia, Acadia, Anglo-Saxon England, Medieval Iceland, the American Old West, Gaelic Ireland, and law merchant, admiralty law, and early common law.

Anarcho-capitalism is distinguished from minarchism, which advocates a night-watchman state limited to protecting individuals from aggression and enforcing private property. Anarcho-capitalism is also generally distinguished from anarchism, an anti-capitalist movement that opposes unnecessary coercion and hierarchy, and social anarchism, a branch of anarchism that sees individual freedom as interrelated with mutual aid. Unlike most anarchists, anarcho-capitalists support private property and private institutions. Anarcho-capitalists also reject the libertarian socialist economic theories of anarchism, arguing that they are inherently authoritarian or require authoritarianism to achieve. Despite its name, anarcho-capitalism lies outside the tradition of the vast majority of anarchists school of thoughts and is more closely affiliated with capitalism, right-libertarianism and classical liberalism. Traditional anarchist schools of thought oppose and reject capitalism, and consider "anarcho-capitalism" to be a contradiction in terms, although some, including anarcho-capitalists and right-libertarians, have argued that anarcho-capitalism is a form of anarchism. Anarcho-capitalism is usually seen as part of the New Right.

Philosophy 

Author J Michael Oliver says that during the 1960s, a philosophical movement arose in the United States that championed "reason, ethical egoism, and free-market capitalism". According to Oliver, anarcho-capitalism is a political theory which logically follows the philosophical conclusions of Objectivism, a philosophical system developed by Russian-American writer Ayn Rand. Professor Lisa Duggan also says that Rand's anti-statist, pro–"free market" stances went on to shape the politics of anarcho-capitalism.

According to Patrik Schumacher, the political ideology and programme of Anarcho-capitalism envisages the radicalization of the neoliberal "rollback of the state", and calls for the extension of "entrepreneurial freedom" and "competitive market rationality" to the point where the scope for private enterprise is all-encompassing and "leaves no space for state action whatsoever".

On the state 
Anarcho-capitalists opposition to the state is reflected in their goal of keeping but privatizing all functions of the state. They see capitalism and the "free market" as the basis for a free and prosperous society. Murray Rothbard, who is credited with coining the term anarcho-capitalism, stated that the difference between free-market capitalism and state capitalism is the difference between "peaceful, voluntary exchange" and a "collusive partnership" between business and government that "uses coercion to subvert the free market".

Rothbard argued that all government services, including defense, are inefficient because they lack a market-based pricing mechanism regulated by "the voluntary decisions of consumers purchasing services that fulfill their highest-priority needs" and by investors seeking the most profitable enterprises to invest in. Furthermore, Linda and Morris Tannehill believe that no coercive monopoly of force can arise on a truly free market and that a government's citizenry can not desert them in favor of a competent protection and defense agency.

Maverick Edwards of the Liberty University describes anarcho-capitalism as a political, social, and economic theory that places markets as the central "governing body" and where government no longer "grants" rights to its citizenry.

Non-aggression principle 

Writer Stanisław Wójtowicz says that although anarcho-capitalists are against centralized states, they hold that all people would naturally share and agree to a specific moral theory based on the non-aggression principle. While the Friedmanian formulation of anarcho-capitalism is robust to the presence of violence and in fact, assumes some degree of violence will occur, anarcho-capitalism as formulated by Rothbard and others holds strongly to the central libertarian nonaggression axiom, sometimes non-aggression principle. Rothbard wrote:

Rothbard's defense of the self-ownership principle stems from what he believed to be his falsification of all other alternatives, namely that either a group of people can own another group of people, or that no single person has full ownership over one's self. Rothbard dismisses these two cases on the basis that they cannot result in a universal ethic, i.e. a just natural law that can govern all people, independent of place and time. The only alternative that remains to Rothbard is self-ownership which he believes is both axiomatic and universal.

In general, the non-aggression axiom is described by Rothbard as a prohibition against the initiation of force, or the threat of force, against persons (in which he includes direct violence, assault and murder) or property (in which he includes fraud, burglary, theft and taxation). The initiation of force is usually referred to as aggression or coercion. The difference between anarcho-capitalists and other libertarians is largely one of the degree to which they take this axiom. Minarchist libertarians such as libertarian political parties would retain the state in some smaller and less invasive form, retaining at the very least public police, courts, and military. However, others might give further allowance for other government programs. In contrast, Rothbard rejects any level of "state intervention", defining the state as a coercive monopoly and as the only entity in human society, excluding acknowledged criminals, that derives its income entirely from coercion, in the form of taxation, which Rothbard describes as "compulsory seizure of the property of the State's inhabitants, or subjects."

Some anarcho-capitalists such as Rothbard accept the non-aggression axiom on an intrinsic moral or natural law basis. It is in terms of the non-aggression principle that Rothbard defined his interpretation of anarchism, "a system which provides no legal sanction for such aggression ['against person and property']"; and wrote that "what anarchism proposes to do, then, is to abolish the State, i.e. to abolish the regularized institution of aggressive coercion". In an interview published in the American libertarian journal The New Banner, Rothbard stated that "capitalism is the fullest expression of anarchism, and anarchism is the fullest expression of capitalism".

Property

Private property 
Anarcho-capitalists postulate the privatization of everything, including cities with all their infrastructures, public spaces, streets and urban management systems.

Central to Rothbardian anarcho-capitalism are the concepts of self-ownership and original appropriation that combines personal and private property. Hans-Hermann Hoppe wrote:

Rothbard however rejected the Lockean proviso, and followed the rule of "first come, first served", without any consideration of how much resources are left for other individuals, which opposed John Locke's beliefs.

Anarcho-capitalists advocate private ownership of the means of production and the allocation of the product of labor created by workers within the context of wage labour and the free market – that is through decisions made by property and capital owners, regardless of what an individual needs or does not need. Original appropriation allows an individual to claim any never-before-used resources, including land and by improving or otherwise using it, own it with the same "absolute right" as their own body, and retaining those rights forever, regardless of whether the resource is still being used by them. According to Rothbard, property can only come about through labor, therefore original appropriation of land is not legitimate by merely claiming it or building a fence around it—it is only by using land and by mixing one's labor with it that original appropriation is legitimized: "Any attempt to claim a new resource that someone does not use would have to be considered invasive of the property right of whoever the first user will turn out to be". Rothbard argued that the resource need not continue to be used in order for it to be the person's property as "for once his labor is mixed with the natural resource, it remains his owned land. His labor has been irretrievably mixed with the land, and the land is therefore his or his assigns' in perpetuity".

Rothbard also spoke about a theory of justice in property rights:

In Justice and Property Right, Rothbard wrote that "any identifiable owner (the original victim of theft or his heir) must be accorded his property". In the case of slavery, Rothbard claimed that in many cases "the old plantations and the heirs and descendants of the former slaves can be identified, and the reparations can become highly specific indeed". Rothbard believed slaves rightfully own any land they were forced to work on under the homestead principle. If property is held by the state, Rothbard advocated its confiscation and "return to the private sector", writing that "any property in the hands of the State is in the hands of thieves, and should be liberated as quickly as possible". Rothbard proposed that state universities be seized by the students and faculty under the homestead principle. Rothbard also supported the expropriation of nominally "private property" if it is the result of state-initiated force such as businesses that receive grants and subsidies. Rothbard further proposed that businesses who receive at least 50% of their funding from the state be confiscated by the workers, writing: "What we libertarians object to, then, is not government per se but crime, what we object to is unjust or criminal property titles; what we are for is not 'private' property per se but just, innocent, non-criminal private property".

Similarly, Karl Hess wrote that "libertarianism wants to advance principles of property but that it in no way wishes to defend, willy nilly, all property which now is called private ... Much of that property is stolen. Much is of dubious title. All of it is deeply intertwined with an immoral, coercive state system".

By accepting an axiomatic definition of private property and property rights, anarcho-capitalists deny the legitimacy of a state on principle. Hans-Hermann Hoppe argues:

Anarchists view capitalism as an inherently authoritarian and hierarchical system and seek the abolishment of private property. There is disagreement between anarchists and anarcho-capitalists as the former generally rejects anarcho-capitalism as a form of anarchism and considers anarcho-capitalism a contradiction in terms, while the latter holds that the abolishment of private property would require expropriation which is "counterproductive to order" and would require a state.

Common property 
As opposed to anarchists, most anarcho-capitalists reject the commons. However, some of them propose that non-state public or community property can also exist in an anarcho-capitalist society. For anarcho-capitalists, what is important is that it is "acquired" and transferred without help or hindrance from what they call the "compulsory state". Deontological anarcho-capitalists believe that the only just and most economically beneficial way to acquire property is through voluntary trade, gift, or labor-based original appropriation, rather than through aggression or fraud.

Anarcho-capitalists state that there could be cases where common property may develop in a Lockean natural rights framework. Anarcho-capitalists make the example of a number of private businesses which may arise in an area, each owning the land and buildings that they use, but they argue that the paths between them become cleared and trodden incrementally through customer and commercial movement. These thoroughfares may become valuable to the community, but according to them ownership cannot be attributed to any single person and original appropriation does not apply because many contributed the labor necessary to create them. In order to prevent it from falling to the "tragedy of the commons", anarcho-capitalists suggest transitioning from common to private property, wherein an individual would make a homesteading claim based on disuse, acquire title by the assent of the community consensus, form a corporation with other involved parties, or other means.

Randall G. Holcombe see challenges stemming from the idea of common property under anarcho-capitalism, such as whether an individual might claim fishing rights in the area of a major shipping lane and thereby forbid passage through it. In contrast, Hoppe's work on anarcho-capitalist theory is based on the assumption that all property is privately held, "including all streets, rivers, airports, and harbors" which forms the foundation of his views on immigration.

Intellectual property 

Some anarcho-capitalists strongly oppose intellectual property (i.e., trademarks, patents, copyrights). Stephan N. Kinsella argues that ownership only relates to tangible assets.

Contractual society 
The society envisioned by anarcho-capitalists has been labelled by them as a "contractual society" which Rothbard described as "a society based purely on voluntary action, entirely unhampered by violence or threats of violence" The system relies on contracts between individuals as the legal framework which would be enforced by private police and security forces as well as private arbitrations.

Rothbard argues that limited liability for corporations could also exist through contract, arguing that "[c]orporations are not at all monopolistic privileges; they are free associations of individuals pooling their capital. On the purely free market, those men would simply announce to their creditors that their liability is limited to the capital specifically invested in the corporation". However, corporations created in this way would not be able to replicate the limit on liabilities arising non-contractually such as liability in tort for environmental disasters or personal injury which corporations currently enjoy. Rothbard acknowledges that "limited liability for torts is the illegitimate conferring of a special privilege".

There are limits to the right to contract under some interpretations of anarcho-capitalism. Rothbard believes that the right to contract is based in inalienable rights and because of this any contract that implicitly violates those rights can be voided at will, preventing a person from permanently selling himself or herself into unindentured slavery. However, Rothbard justifies the practice of child selling. Other interpretations conclude that banning such contracts would in itself be an unacceptably invasive interference in the right to contract.

Included in the right of contract is "the right to contract oneself out for employment by others". While anarchists criticize wage labour describing it as wage slavery, anarcho-capitalists view it as a consensual contract. Some anarcho-capitalists prefer to see self-employment prevail over wage labor. David D. Friedman has expressed a preference for a society where "almost everyone is self-employed" and "instead of corporations there are large groups of entrepreneurs related by trade, not authority. Each sells not his time, but what his time produces".

Law and order and the use of violence 
Different anarcho-capitalists propose different forms of anarcho-capitalism and one area of disagreement is in the area of law. In The Market for Liberty, Morris and Linda Tannehill object to any statutory law whatsoever. They argue that all one has to do is ask if one is aggressing against another in order to decide if an act is right or wrong.

Unlike both the Tannehills and Rothbard who see an ideological commonality of ethics and morality as a requirement, David D. Friedman proposes that "the systems of law will be produced for profit on the open market, just as books and bras are produced today. There could be competition among different brands of law, just as there is competition among different brands of cars". Friedman says whether this would lead to a libertarian society "remains to be proven". He says it is a possibility that very un-libertarian laws may result, such as laws against drugs, but he thinks this would be rare. He reasons that "if the value of a law to its supporters is less than its cost to its victims, that law ... will not survive in an anarcho-capitalist society".

Anarcho-capitalists only accept the collective defense of individual liberty (i.e. courts, military, or police forces) insofar as such groups are formed and paid for on an explicitly voluntary basis. However, their complaint is not just that the state's defensive services are funded by taxation, but that the state assumes it is the only legitimate practitioner of physical force—that is, they believe it forcibly prevents the private sector from providing comprehensive security, such as a police, judicial and prison systems to protect individuals from aggressors. Anarcho-capitalists believe that there is nothing morally superior about the state which would grant it, but not private individuals, a right to use physical force to restrain aggressors. If competition in security provision were allowed to exist, prices would also be lower and services would be better according to anarcho-capitalists. According to Molinari: "Under a regime of liberty, the natural organization of the security industry would not be different from that of other industries". Proponents believe that private systems of justice and defense already exist, naturally forming where the market is allowed to "compensate for the failure of the state", namely private arbitration, security guards, neighborhood watch groups and so on. These private courts and police are sometimes referred to generically as private defense agencies (PDAs). The defense of those unable to pay for such protection might be financed by charitable organizations relying on voluntary donation rather than by state institutions relying on taxation, or by cooperative self-help by groups of individuals. Edward Stringham argues that private adjudication of disputes could enable the market to internalize externalities and provide services that customers desire.

In the context of revolution, Rothbard stated that the American Revolutionary War was the only war involving the United States that could be justified. Some anarcho-capitalists such as Rothbard feel that violent revolution is counter-productive and prefer voluntary forms of economic secession to the extent possible. Retributive justice is often a component of the contracts imagined for an anarcho-capitalist society. According to Matthew O'Keefee, some anarcho-capitalists believe prisons or indentured servitude would be justifiable institutions to deal with those who violate anarcho-capitalist property relations while others believe exile or forced restitution are sufficient.

Bruce L. Benson argues that legal codes may impose punitive damages for intentional torts in the interest of deterring crime. Benson gives the example of a thief who breaks into a house by picking a lock. Even if caught before taking anything, Benson argues that the thief would still owe the victim for violating the sanctity of his property rights. Benson opines that despite the lack of objectively measurable losses in such cases, "standardized rules that are generally perceived to be fair by members of the community would, in all likelihood, be established through precedent, allowing judgments to specify payments that are reasonably appropriate for most criminal offenses".

Morris and Linda Tannehill raise a similar example, saying that a bank robber who had an attack of conscience and returned the money would still owe reparations for endangering the employees' and customers' lives and safety, in addition to the costs of the defense agency answering the teller's call for help. However, they believe that the robber's loss of reputation would be even more damaging. They suggest that specialized companies would list aggressors so that anyone wishing to do business with a man could first check his record, provided they trust the veracity of the companies' records. They further theorise that the bank robber would find insurance companies listing him as a very poor risk and other firms would be reluctant to enter into contracts with him.

Influences 
Murray Rothbard has listed different ideologies of which his interpretations, he said, have influenced anarcho-capitalism. This includes his interpretation of anarchism, and more precisely individualist anarchism; classical liberalism and the Austrian School of economic thought. Scholars additionally associate anarcho-capitalism with neo-classical liberalism, radical neoliberalism and right-libertarianism.

Anarchism 

In both its social and individualist forms, anarchism is usually considered an anti-capitalist and radical left-wing or far-left movement that promotes libertarian socialist economic theories such as collectivism, communism, individualism, mutualism and syndicalism. Because anarchism is usually described alongside libertarian Marxism as the libertarian wing of the socialist movement and as having a historical association with anti-capitalism and socialism, anarchists believe that capitalism is incompatible with social and economic equality and therefore do not recognize anarcho-capitalism as an anarchist school of thought. In particular, anarchists argue that capitalist transactions are not voluntary and that maintaining the class structure of a capitalist society requires coercion which is incompatible with an anarchist society. The usage of libertarian is also in dispute. While both anarchists and anarcho-capitalists have used it, libertarian was synonymous with anarchist until the mid-20th century, when anarcho-capitalist theory developed.

Anarcho-capitalists are distinguished from the dominant anarchist tradition by their relation to property and capital. While both anarchism and anarcho-capitalism share general antipathy towards power by government authority, the latter exempts power wielded through free-market capitalism. Anarchists, including egoists such as Max Stirner, have supported the protection of an individual's freedom from powers of both government and private property owners. In contrast, while condemning governmental encroachment on personal liberties, anarcho-capitalists support freedoms based on private property rights. Anarcho-capitalist theorist Murray Rothbard argued that protesters should rent a street for protest from its owners. The abolition of public amenities is a common theme in some anarcho-capitalist writings.

As anarcho-capitalism puts laissez-faire economics before economic equality, it is commonly viewed as incompatible with the anti-capitalist and egalitarian tradition of anarchism. Although anarcho-capitalist theory implies the abolition of the state in favour of a fully laissez-faire economy, it lies outside the tradition of anarchism. While using the language of anarchism, anarcho-capitalism only shares anarchism's antipathy towards the state and not anarchism's antipathy towards hierarchy as theorists expect from anarcho-capitalist economic power relations. It follows a different paradigm from anarchism and has a fundamentally different approach and goals. In spite of the anarcho- in its title, anarcho-capitalism is more closely affiliated with capitalism, right-libertarianism, and liberalism than with anarchism. Some within this laissez-faire tradition reject the designation of anarcho-capitalism, believing that capitalism may either refer to the laissez-faire market they support or the government-regulated system that they oppose.

Rothbard argued that anarcho-capitalism is the only true form of anarchism—the only form of anarchism that could possibly exist in reality as he maintained that any other form presupposes authoritarian enforcement of a political ideology such as "redistribution of private property", which he attributed to anarchism. According to this argument, the capitalist free market is "the natural situation" that would result from people being free from state authority and entails the establishment of all voluntary associations in society such as cooperatives, non-profit organizations, businesses and so on. Moreover, anarcho-capitalists, as well as classical liberal minarchists, argue that the application of anarchist ideals as advocated by what they term "left-wing anarchists" would require an authoritarian body of some sort to impose it. Based on their understanding and interpretation of anarchism, in order to forcefully prevent people from accumulating capital, which they believe is a goal of anarchists, there would necessarily be a redistributive organization of some sort which would have the authority to in essence exact a tax and re-allocate the resulting resources to a larger group of people. They conclude that this theoretical body would inherently have political power and would be nothing short of a state. The difference between such an arrangement and an anarcho-capitalist system is what anarcho-capitalists see as the voluntary nature of organization within anarcho-capitalism contrasted with a "centralized ideology" and a "paired enforcement mechanism" which they believe would be necessary under what they describe as a "coercively" egalitarian-anarchist system.

Rothbard also argued that the capitalist system of today is not properly anarchistic because it often colludes with the state. According to Rothbard, "what Marx and later writers have done is to lump together two extremely different and even contradictory concepts and actions under the same portmanteau term. These two contradictory concepts are what I would call 'free-market capitalism' on the one hand, and 'state capitalism' on the other". "The difference between free-market capitalism and state capitalism", writes Rothbard, "is precisely the difference between, on the one hand, peaceful, voluntary exchange, and on the other, violent expropriation". He continues: "State capitalism inevitably creates all sorts of problems which become insoluble".

Traditional anarchists reject the notion of capitalism, hierarchies and private property. Albert Meltzer argued that anarcho-capitalism simply cannot be anarchism because capitalism and the state are inextricably interlinked and because capitalism exhibits domineering hierarchical structures such as that between an employer and an employee. Anna Morgenstern approaches this topic from the opposite perspective, arguing that anarcho-capitalists are not really capitalists because "mass concentration of capital is impossible" without the state. According to Jeremy Jennings, "[i]t is hard not to conclude that these ideas", referring to anarcho-capitalism, argued to have "roots deep in classical liberalism" more so than in anarchism, "are described as anarchist only on the basis of a misunderstanding of what anarchism is". For Jennings, "anarchism does not stand for the untrammelled freedom of the individual (as the 'anarcho-capitalists' appear to believe) but, as we have already seen, for the extension of individuality and community". Similarly, Barbara Goodwin, Emeritus Professor of Politics at the University of East Anglia, Norwich, argues that anarcho-capitalism's "true place is in the group of right-wing libertarians", not in anarchism.

Some right-libertarian scholars like Michael Huemer, who identify with the ideology, describe anarcho-capitalism as a "variety of anarchism". British author Andrew Heywood also believes that "individualist anarchism overlaps with libertarianism and is usually linked to a strong belief in the market as a self-regulating mechanism, most obviously manifest in the form of anarcho-capitalism". Frank H. Brooks, author of The Individualist Anarchists: An Anthology of Liberty (1881–1908), believes that "anarchism has always included a significant strain of radical individualism, from the hyperrationalism of Godwin, to the egoism of Stirner, to the libertarians and anarcho-capitalists of today".

While both anarchism and anarcho-capitalism are in opposition to the state, it is a necessary but not sufficient condition because anarchists and anarcho-capitalists interpret state-rejection differently. Austrian school economist David Prychitko, in the context of anarcho-capitalism says that "while society without a state is necessary for full-fledged anarchy, it is nevertheless insufficient". According to Ruth Kinna, anarcho-capitalists are anti-statists who draw more on right-wing liberal theory and the Austrian School than anarchist traditions. Kinna writes that "[i]n order to highlight the clear distinction between the two positions", anarchists describe anarcho-capitalists as "propertarians". Anarcho-capitalism is usually seen as part of the New Right.

Some anarcho-capitalists argue that, according to them, anarchists consider the word "anarchy" as to be the antithesis of hierarchy, and therefore, that "anarcho-capitalism" is sometimes considered to be a term with differences philosophically to what they personally consider to be true anarchism, as an anarcho-capitalist society would inherently contain hierarchy. Additionally, Rothbard discusses the difference between "government" and "governance" thus, proponents of anarchocapitalism think the philosophy's common name is indeed consistent, as it promotes private governance, but is vehemently anti-government.

Classical liberalism 

Historian and libertarian Ralph Raico argued that what liberal philosophers "had come up with was a form of individualist anarchism, or, as it would be called today, anarcho-capitalism or market anarchism". He also said that Gustave de Molinari was proposing a doctrine of the private production of security, a position which was later taken up by Murray Rothbard. Some anarcho-capitalists consider Molinari to be the first proponent of anarcho-capitalism. In the preface to the 1977 English translation by Murray Rothbard called The Production of Security the "first presentation anywhere in human history of what is now called anarcho-capitalism", although admitting that "Molinari did not use the terminology, and probably would have balked at the name". Hans-Hermann Hoppe said that "the 1849 article 'The Production of Security' is probably the single most important contribution to the modern theory of anarcho-capitalism". According to Hans-Hermann Hoppe, one of the 19th century precursors of anarcho-capitalism were philosopher Herbert Spencer, classical liberal Auberon Herbert and liberal socialist Franz Oppenheimer.

Ruth Kinna writes that anarcho-capitalism is a term coined by Murray Rothbard to describe "a commitment to unregulated private property and laissez-faire economics, prioritizing the liberty-rights of individuals, unfettered by government regulation, to accumulate, consume and determine the patterns of their lives as they see fit". According to Kinna, anarcho-capitalists "will sometimes label themselves market anarchists because they recognize the negative connotations of 'capitalism'. But the literature of anarcho-capitalism draws on classical liberal theory, particularly the Austrian School – Friedrich von Hayek and Ludwig von Mises – rather than recognizable anarchist traditions. Ayn Rand's laissez-faire, anti-government, corporate philosophy – Objectivism – is sometimes associated with anarcho-capitalism". Other scholars similarly associate anarcho-capitalism with anti-state classical liberalism, neo-classical liberalism, radical neoliberalism and right-libertarianism.

Paul Dragos Aligica writes that there is a "foundational difference between the classical liberal and the anarcho-capitalist positions". Classical liberalism, while accepting critical arguments against collectivism, acknowledges a certain level of public ownership and collective governance as necessary to provide practical solutions to political problems. In contrast anarcho-capitalism, according to Aligica, denies any requirement for any form of public administration, and allows no meaningful role for the public sphere, which is seen as sub-optimal and illegitimate.

Individualist anarchism 

Murray Rothbard, a student of Ludwig von Mises, stated that he was influenced by the work of the 19th-century American individualist anarchists. In the winter of 1949, Rothbard decided to reject minimal state laissez-faire and embrace his interpretation of individualist anarchism. In 1965, Rothbard wrote that "Lysander Spooner and Benjamin R. Tucker were unsurpassed as political philosophers and nothing is more needed today than a revival and development of the largely forgotten legacy they left to political philosophy". However, Rothbard thought that they had a faulty understanding of economics as the 19th-century individualist anarchists had a labor theory of value as influenced by the classical economists, while Rothbard was a student of Austrian School economics which does not agree with the labor theory of value. Rothbard sought to meld 19th-century American individualist anarchists' advocacy of economic individualism and free markets with the principles of Austrian School economics, arguing that "[t]here is, in the body of thought known as 'Austrian economics', a scientific explanation of the workings of the free market (and of the consequences of government intervention in that market) which individualist anarchists could easily incorporate into their political and social Weltanschauung". Rothbard held that the economic consequences of the political system they advocate would not result in an economy with people being paid in proportion to labor amounts, nor would profit and interest disappear as they expected. Tucker thought that unregulated banking and money issuance would cause increases in the money supply so that interest rates would drop to zero or near to it. Peter Marshall states that "anarcho-capitalism overlooks the egalitarian implications of traditional individualist anarchists like Spooner and Tucker". Stephanie Silberstein states that "While Spooner was no free-market capitalist, nor an anarcho-capitalist, he was not as opposed to capitalism as most socialists were."

In "The Spooner-Tucker Doctrine: An Economist's View", Rothbard explained his disagreements. Rothbard disagreed with Tucker that it would cause the money supply to increase because he believed that the money supply in a free market would be self-regulating. If it were not, then Rothbard argued inflation would occur so it is not necessarily desirable to increase the money supply in the first place. Rothbard claimed that Tucker was wrong to think that interest would disappear regardless because he believed people, in general, do not wish to lend their money to others without compensation, so there is no reason why this would change just because banking was unregulated. Tucker held a labor theory of value and thought that in a free market people would be paid in proportion to how much labor they exerted and that exploitation or usury was taking place if they were not. As Tucker explained in State Socialism and Anarchism, his theory was that unregulated banking would cause more money to be available and that this would allow the proliferation of new businesses which would, in turn, raise demand for labor. This led Tucker to believe that the labor theory of value would be vindicated and equal amounts of labor would receive equal pay. As an Austrian School economist, Rothbard did not agree with the labor theory and believed that prices of goods and services are proportional to marginal utility rather than to labor amounts in the free market. As opposed to Tucker he did not think that there was anything exploitative about people receiving an income according to how much "buyers of their services value their labor" or what that labor produces.

Without the labor theory of value, some argue that 19th-century individualist anarchists approximate the modern movement of anarcho-capitalism, although this has been contested or rejected. As economic theory changed, the popularity of the labor theory of classical economics was superseded by the subjective theory of value of neoclassical economics and Rothbard combined Mises' Austrian School of economics with the absolutist views of human rights and rejection of the state he had absorbed from studying the individualist American anarchists of the 19th century such as Tucker and Spooner. In the mid-1950s, Rothbard wrote an unpublished article named "Are Libertarians 'Anarchists'?" under the pseudonym "Aubrey Herbert", concerned with differentiating himself from communist and socialistic economic views of anarchists, including the individualist anarchists of the 19th century, concluding that "we are not anarchists and that those who call us anarchists are not on firm etymological ground and are being completely unhistorical. On the other hand, it is clear that we are not archists either: we do not believe in establishing a tyrannical central authority that will coerce the noninvasive as well as the invasive. Perhaps, then, we could call ourselves by a new name: nonarchist." Joe Peacott, an American individualist anarchist in the mutualist tradition, criticizes anarcho-capitalists for trying to hegemonize the individualist anarchism label and make appear as if all individualist anarchists are in favor of capitalism. Peacott states that "individualists, both past and present, agree with the communist anarchists that present-day capitalism is based on economic coercion, not on voluntary contract. Rent and interest are the mainstays of modern capitalism and are protected and enforced by the state. Without these two unjust institutions, capitalism could not exist".

Anarchist activists and scholars do not consider anarcho-capitalism as a part of the anarchist movement because anarchism has historically been an anti-capitalist movement and see it as incompatible with capitalist forms. Although some regard anarcho-capitalism as a form of individualist anarchism, many others disagree or contest the existence of an individualist–socialist divide because individualist anarchism is largely libertarian socialist. In coming to terms that anarchists mostly identified with socialism, Rothbard wrote that individualist anarchism is different from anarcho-capitalism and other capitalist theories due to the individualist anarchists retaining the labor theory of value and socialist doctrines. Similarly, many writers deny that anarcho-capitalism is a form of anarchism or that capitalism is compatible with anarchism.

The Palgrave Handbook of Anarchism writes that "[a]s Benjamin Franks rightly points out, individualisms that defend or reinforce hierarchical forms such as the economic-power relations of anarcho-capitalism are incompatible with practices of social anarchism based on developing immanent goods which contest such as inequalities". Laurence Davis cautiously asks "[I]s anarcho-capitalism really a form of anarchism or instead a wholly different ideological paradigm whose adherents have attempted to expropriate the language of anarchism for their own anti-anarchist ends?" Davis cites Iain McKay, "whom Franks cites as an authority to support his contention that 'academic analysis has followed activist currents in rejecting the view that anarcho-capitalism has anything to do with social anarchism'", as arguing "quite emphatically on the very pages cited by Franks that anarcho-capitalism is by no means a type of anarchism". McKay writes that "[i]t is important to stress that anarchist opposition to the so-called capitalist 'anarchists' does not reflect some kind of debate within anarchism, as many of these types like to pretend, but a debate between anarchism and its old enemy capitalism. ... Equally, given that anarchists and 'anarcho'-capitalists have fundamentally different analyses and goals it is hardly 'sectarian' to point this out".

Davis writes that "Franks asserts without supporting evidence that most major forms of individualist anarchism have been largely anarcho-capitalist in content, and concludes from this premise that most forms of individualism are incompatible with anarchism". Davis argues that "the conclusion is unsustainable because the premise is false, depending as it does for any validity it might have on the further assumption that anarcho-capitalism is indeed a form of anarchism. If we reject this view, then we must also reject the individual anarchist versus the communal anarchist 'chasm' style of argument that follows from it". Davis maintains that "the ideological core of anarchism is the belief that society can and should be organised without hierarchy and domination. Historically, anarchists have struggles against a wide range of regimes of domination, from capitalism, the state system, patriarchy, heterosexism, and the domination of nature to colonialism, the war system, slavery, fascism, white supremacy, and certain forms of organised religion". According to Davis, "[w]hile these visions range from the predominantly individualistic to the predominantly communitarian, features common to virtually all include an emphasis on self-management and self-regulatory methods of organisation, voluntary association, decentralised society, based on the principle of free association, in which people will manage and govern themselves". Finally, Davis includes a footnote stating that "[i]ndividualist anarchism may plausibly be re regarded as a form of both socialism and anarchism. Whether the individualist anarchists were consistent anarchists (and socialists) is another question entirely. ... McKay comments as follows: 'any individualist anarchism which supports wage labour is inconsistent anarchism. It can easily be made consistent anarchism by applying its own principles consistently. In contrast 'anarcho'-capitalism rejects so many of the basic, underlying, principles of anarchism ... that it cannot be made consistent with the ideals of anarchism'".

Historical precedents 
Several anarcho-capitalists and right-libertarians have discussed historical precedents of what they believe were examples of anarcho-capitalism.

Free cities of medieval Europe 
Economist and libertarian scholar Bryan Caplan considers the free cities of medieval Europe as examples of "anarchist" or "nearly anarchistic" societies, further arguing:

Medieval Iceland 

According to the libertarian theorist David D. Friedman, "[m]edieval Icelandic institutions have several peculiar and interesting characteristics; they might almost have been invented by a mad economist to test the lengths to which market systems could supplant government in its most fundamental functions". While not directly labeling it anarcho-capitalist, Friedman argues that the legal system of the Icelandic Commonwealth comes close to being a real-world anarcho-capitalist legal system. Although noting that there was a single legal system, Friedman argues that enforcement of the law was entirely private and highly capitalist, providing some evidence of how such a society would function. Friedman further wrote that "[e]ven where the Icelandic legal system recognized an essentially 'public' offense, it dealt with it by giving some individual (in some cases chosen by lot from those affected) the right to pursue the case and collect the resulting fine, thus fitting it into an essentially private system".

Friedman and Bruce L. Benson argued that the Icelandic Commonwealth saw significant economic and social progress in the absence of systems of criminal law, an executive, or bureaucracy. This commonwealth was led by chieftains, whose position could be bought and sold like that of private property. Being a member of the chieftainship was also completely voluntary.

American Old West 
According to Terry L. Anderson and P. J. Hill, the Old West in the United States in the period of 1830 to 1900 was similar to anarcho-capitalism in that "private agencies provided the necessary basis for an orderly society in which property was protected and conflicts were resolved" and that the common popular perception that the Old West was chaotic with little respect for property rights is incorrect. Since squatters had no claim to western lands under federal law, extra-legal organizations formed to fill the void. Benson explains:

According to Anderson, "[d]efining anarcho-capitalist to mean minimal government with property rights developed from the bottom up, the western frontier was anarcho-capitalistic. People on the frontier invented institutions that fit the resource constraints they faced".

Gaelic Ireland 

In his work For a New Liberty, Murray Rothbard has claimed ancient Gaelic Ireland as an example of nearly anarcho-capitalist society. In his depiction, citing the work of Professor Joseph Peden, the basic political unit of ancient Ireland was the tuath, which is portrayed as "a body of persons voluntarily united for socially beneficial purposes" with its territorial claim being limited to "the sum total of the landed properties of its members". Civil disputes were settled by private arbiters called "brehons" and the compensation to be paid to the wronged party was insured through voluntary surety relationships. Commenting on the "kings" of tuaths, Rothbard stated:

Law merchant, admiralty law, and early common law 
Some libertarians have cited law merchant, admiralty law and early common law as examples of anarcho-capitalism.

In his work Power and Market, Rothbard stated:

Somalia from 1991 to 2006 

Economist Alex Tabarrok argued that Somalia in its stateless period provided a "unique test of the theory of anarchy", in some aspects near of that espoused by anarcho-capitalists David D. Friedman and Murray Rothbard. Nonetheless, both anarchists and some anarcho-capitalists argue that Somalia was not an anarchist society.

Analysis and criticism

State, justice and defense 

Anarchists such as Brian Morris argue that anarcho-capitalism does not in fact get rid of the state. He says that anarcho-capitalists "simply replaced the state with private security firms, and can hardly be described as anarchists as the term is normally understood". In "Libertarianism: Bogus Anarchy", anarchist Peter Sabatini notes:

Similarly, Bob Black argues that an anarcho-capitalist wants to "abolish the state to his own satisfaction by calling it something else". He states that they do not denounce what the state does, they just "object to who's doing it".

Paul Birch argues that legal disputes involving several jurisdictions and different legal systems will be too complex and costly. He therefore argues that anarcho-capitalism is inherently unstable, and would evolve, entirely through the operation of free market forces, into either a single dominant private court with a natural monopoly of justice over the territory (a de facto state), a society of multiple city states, each with a territorial monopoly, or a 'pure anarchy' that would rapidly descend into chaos.

Randall G. Holcombe argues that anarcho-capitalism turns justice into a commodity as private defense and court firms would favour those who pay more for their services. He argues that defense agencies could form cartels and oppress people without fear of competition. Philosopher Albert Meltzer argued that since anarcho-capitalism promotes the idea of private armies, it actually supports a "limited State". He contends that it "is only possible to conceive of Anarchism which is free, communistic and offering no economic necessity for repression of countering it".

Libertarian Robert Nozick argues that a competitive legal system would evolve toward a monopoly government—even without violating individuals' rights in the process. In Anarchy, State, and Utopia, Nozick defends minarchism and argues that an anarcho-capitalist society would inevitably transform into a minarchist state through the eventual emergence of a monopolistic private defense and judicial agency that no longer faces competition. He argues that anarcho-capitalism results in an unstable system that would not endure in the real world. While anarcho-capitalists such as Roy Childs and Murray Rothbard have rejected Nozick's arguments, with Rothbard arguing that the process described by Nozick, with the dominant protection agency outlawing its competitors, in fact violates its own clients' rights, John Jefferson actually advocates Nozick's argument and states that such events would best operate in laissez-faire. Robert Ellickson presented a Hayekian case against anarcho-capitalism, calling it a "pipe-dream" and stating that anarcho-capitalists "by imagining a stable system of competing private associations, ignore both the inevitability of territorial monopolists in governance, and the importance of institutions to constrain those monopolists' abuses".

Some libertarians argue that anarcho-capitalism would result in different standards of justice and law due to relying too much on the market. Friedman responded to this criticism by arguing that it assumes the state is controlled by a majority group that has similar legal ideals. If the populace is diverse, different legal standards would therefore be appropriate.

Rights and freedom 
Negative and positive rights are rights that oblige either action (positive rights) or inaction (negative rights). Anarcho-capitalists believe that negative rights should be recognized as legitimate, but positive rights should be rejected as an intrusion. Some critics reject the distinction between positive and negative rights. Peter Marshall also states that the anarcho-capitalist definition of freedom is entirely negative and that it cannot guarantee the positive freedom of individual autonomy and independence.

About anarcho-capitalism, anarcho-syndicalist and anti-capitalist intellectual Noam Chomsky says:

Economics and property 
Social anarchists argue that anarcho-capitalism allows individuals to accumulate significant power through free markets and private property. Friedman responded by arguing that the Icelandic Commonwealth was able to prevent the wealthy from abusing the poor by requiring individuals who engaged in acts of violence to compensate their victims financially.

Anarchists argue that certain capitalist transactions are not voluntary and that maintaining the class structure of a capitalist society requires coercion which violates anarchist principles. Anthropologist David Graeber noted his skepticism about anarcho-capitalism along the same lines, arguing:

Some critics argue that the anarcho-capitalist concept of voluntary choice ignores constraints due to both human and non-human factors such as the need for food and shelter as well as active restriction of both used and unused resources by those enforcing property claims. If a person requires employment in order to feed and house himself, the employer-employee relationship could be considered involuntary. Another criticism is that employment is involuntary because the economic system that makes it necessary for some individuals to serve others is supported by the enforcement of coercive private property relations. Some philosophies view any ownership claims on land and natural resources as immoral and illegitimate. Objectivist philosopher Harry Binswanger criticizes anarcho-capitalism by arguing that "capitalism requires government", questioning who or what would enforce treaties and contracts.

Some right-libertarian critics of anarcho-capitalism who support the full privatization of capital such as geolibertarians argue that land and the raw materials of nature remain a distinct factor of production and cannot be justly converted to private property because they are not products of human labor. Some socialists, including market anarchists and mutualists, adamantly oppose absentee ownership. Anarcho-capitalists have strong abandonment criteria, namely that one maintains ownership until one agrees to trade or gift it. Anti-state critics of this view posit comparatively weak abandonment criteria, arguing that one loses ownership when one stops personally occupying and using it as well as the idea of perpetually binding original appropriation is anathema to traditional schools of anarchism.

Literature 
The following is a partial list of notable nonfiction works discussing anarcho-capitalism.
 Bruce L. Benson, The Enterprise of Law: Justice Without The State
 To Serve and Protect: Privatization and Community in Criminal Justice
 David D. Friedman, The Machinery of Freedom
 Edward P. Stringham, Anarchy and the Law: The Political Economy of Choice
 George H. Smith, "Justice Entrepreneurship in a Free Market"
 Gerard Casey, Libertarian Anarchy: Against the State
 Hans-Hermann Hoppe, Anarcho-Capitalism: An Annotated Bibliography
 A Theory of Socialism and Capitalism
 Democracy: The God That Failed
 The Economics and Ethics of Private Property
 Linda and Morris Tannehill, The Market for Liberty
 Michael Huemer, The Problem of Political Authority
 Murray Rothbard, founder of anarcho-capitalism:
 For a New Liberty
 Man, Economy, and State
 Power and Market
 The Ethics of Liberty

See also 

 Agorism
 Anarcho-capitalism and minarchism
 Consequentialist libertarianism
 Counter-economics
 Creative disruption
 Crypto-anarchism
 Definition of anarchism and libertarianism
 Issues in anarchism
 Left-wing market anarchism
 Natural-rights libertarianism
 Privatization in criminal justice
 Propertarianism
 Stateless society
 The Libertarian Forum
 Voluntaryism

References

Further reading 
 Brown, Susan Love (1997). "The Free Market as Salvation from Government: The Anarcho-Capitalist View". In Carrier, James G., ed. Meanings of the Market: The Free Market in Western Culture (illustrated ed.). Oxford: Berg Publishers. p. 99. .

External links 

 Anarcho-capitalist FAQ
 LewRockwell.com – website run by Lew Rockwell
 Mises Institute – research and educational center of classical liberalism, including anarcho-capitalism, Austrian School of economics and American libertarian political theory
 Property and Freedom Society – international anarcho-capitalist society
 Strike The Root – an anarcho-capitalist website featuring essays, news, and a forum

 
Austrian School
Capitalist systems
Economic ideologies
Anarcho-capitalism
Ideologies of capitalism
Classical liberalism
Libertarianism by form
Political ideologies
Right-libertarianism
Syncretic political movements
Right-wing ideologies